Kelli Evans  (born July 9, 1968) is an American lawyer who serves as an associate justice of the Supreme Court of California. She previously served as a judge of the Alameda County Superior Court.

Education 

Evans received a Bachelor of Arts from Stanford University in 1991 and a Juris Doctor from UC Davis School of Law in 1994.

Career 

In 1995, Evans served as the assistant public defender in the Sacramento County Public Defender's Office. From 1998 to 2001, she was a senior trial attorney at the United States Department of Justice Civil Rights Division. From 2001 to 2004, she was an associate with Relman and Associates and partner at Independent Assessment & Monitoring LLP from 2006 to 2010. From 2010 to 2013, she was the associate director of the ACLU of Northern California, where she previously served as an attorney from 1995 to 1998. From 2014 to 2017, she served as the senior director for the administration of justice at the California State Bar and from 2017 to 2019, she was special assistant to the attorney general at the California Department of Justice. Evans was a member of the Cleveland Police Monitoring Team. Evans served as a federal court monitor overseeing that the Oakland, California, police department complied with a consent decree that required civil rights reforms. Prior to being appointed to the bench, Evans was chief deputy legal affairs secretary in the Office of Governor Newsom. Evans served as a judge of the Alameda County Superior Court from 2021 to 2023.

California Supreme Court 

NOn August 10, 2022, Governor Gavin Newsom nominated Evans to serve as an associate justice of the Supreme Court of California, to the seat to be vacated by Patricia Guerrero, who has been nominated to serve as chief justice. She would be the first openly lesbian associate justice, and the second out African-American to serve on the court. On November 10, 2022 the Commission on Judicial Appointments voted unanimously to approve Evans to the California Supreme Court. She was sworn into office on January 2, 2023. As of 2023, with her swearing in, Black justices make up half of the associate justices on the court. She is the first openly LGBTQ Woman and first LGBTQ Woman of Color to serve on the court.

Personal life 

Evans is a Democrat.  Evans and her wife, Terri Shaw, have a daughter in college and live in Oakland.

See also 
List of African-American jurists
List of LGBT jurists in the United States
List of LGBT state supreme court justices in the United States

References 

1960s births
Living people
Year of birth missing (living people)
Place of birth missing (living people)
20th-century American women lawyers
20th-century American lawyers
21st-century American women judges
21st-century American judges
21st-century American women lawyers
21st-century American lawyers
21st-century LGBT people
California lawyers
African-American judges
African-American women lawyers
American women judges
California Democrats
California state court judges
Justices of the Supreme Court of California
Lesbians
LGBT judges
LGBT lawyers
LGBT people from California
Public defenders
Stanford University alumni
Superior court judges in the United States
UC Davis School of Law alumni
United States Department of Justice lawyers